is a Japanese film director and screenwriter.  He specializes in feel-good "zero to hero" films, where a group of people take up an unlikely activity, face a number of obstacles, but finally succeed. His film Waterboys was particularly successful and led to a TV series which entered its third season in 2005. He was awarded Best Screenplay at the 2005 Yokohama Film Festival for his film Swing Girls.

Selected filmography

Director

References

External links 
 

1967 births
Living people
Japanese film directors
Tokyo Zokei University alumni